Ölbronn-Dürrn is a municipality in the Enz district of Baden-Württemberg, Germany.

History
Ölbronn was a property of Maulbronn Monastery until 1504, when it became a possession of the Duchy of Württemberg.

The town remained in Pforzheim's jurisdiction through reorganizations in 1809, 1819, and on 1 October 1864, and again on 25 June 1939, when the district became .

The two townships merged into a single municipality, Ölbronn-Dürrn, on 1 July 1974.

Geography
It is physically located on the Stromberg, where its loess-covered keuper and muschelkalk hills meet the flat and dry . Elevation above sea level in the municipal area varies from a low of  Normalnull (NN) where the Salzach flows into Knittlingen, to a high of  NN at the top of the Eichelberg.

The  and  Federally-protected nature reserves are located in the municipal area.

On the municipal area of Ölbronn-Dürrn, there is a lake, which emits occasionally toxic gases. On December 20, 2020, these gases (mainly carbon monoxide) lead to the death of a man and a critical intoxication of his wife .

Coat of arms
Ölbronn-Dürrn's municipal coat of arms displays a black, four-spoked wheel and a red tower fort on a field of gold and above a green hill upon which is a golden acorn and oak leaf. The four-spoked wheel is from the coat of arms of Ölbronn, and has been a symbol associated with the town since 1895. The red tower has likewise been a symbol of Dürrn since the 19th century. The hill and oak leaf and acorn refer to the Eichelberg. The municipal pattern was approved by the Enz district office on 25 September 1985.

References

External links
  (in German)

Enzkreis